Ezmareh or Azmareh may refer to:
 Ezmareh-ye Olya
 Ezmareh-ye Sofla